Zdiby is a municipality and village in Prague-East District in the Central Bohemian Region of the Czech Republic. It has about 3,800 inhabitants.

Administrative parts
Villages of Brnky, Přemyšlení and Veltěž are administrative parts of Zdiby.

History
The first written mention of Zdiby is from 1266. The Church of the Exaltation of the Holy Cross is from the 14th century.

References

External links

 (in Czech)

Villages in Prague-East District